The Roman Catholic Diocese of Innsbruck is a Latin Church suffragan diocese in the Ecclesiastical province of the Metropolitan of Salzburg (in western Austria), covering the Bundesland (state) Tyrol.

Its cathedral episcopal see is the Innsbruck Cathedral, dedicated to Saint James, in the city of Innsbruck.
It also has four Minor basilicas : Herz-Jesu-Basilika, dedicated to the Sacred Heart of Jesus, in Hall in Tirol; St. Michael, in Absam; Unsere Liebe Frau von der Unbefleckten Empfängnis, Immaculate Conception, in Wilten and Zisterzienserkirche, Cistercian monastery in Stams.

History 
 Established on 11 December 1925 as Apostolic Administration of Innsbruck – Feldkirch, on territory split off from Diocese of Brixen 
 6 August 1964: Promoted as Diocese of Innsbruck – Feldkirch
 8 December 1968: Renamed as Diocese of Innsbruck / Œnipontan(us) (Latin), having lost territory to establish Diocese of Feldkirch
 It enjoyed a Papal visit from Pope John Paul II in June 1988.

Statistics 
As per 2014, it pastorally served 395,490 Catholics (72.8% of 543,173 total) on  9,845 km² in 243 parishes and 49 missions with 344 priests (193 diocesan, 151 religious), 64 deacons, 803 lay religious (246 brothers, 557 sisters) and 6 seminarians.

Episcopal Ordinaries 

(al Roman rite)

Apostolic Administrators of Innsbruck – Feldkirch  
 Sigismund Waitz (born Italy) (1921–1938), Titular Bishop of Cibyra (1913.05.09 – 1934.12.17), previously Auxiliary Bishop of Diocese of Brixen (Italy) (1913.05.09 – 1934.12.17); later Metropolitan Archbishop of Salzburg (Austria) ([1934.12.10] 1934.12.17 – death 1941.10.30)
 Auxiliary Bishop: Franz Tschann (born Italy) (1936.08.08 – retired 1955.10.01), Titular Bishop of Panium (1936.08.08 – death 1956.10.10)
 Paulus Rusch (1938.10.15 – 1964.08.06 see below) (born Germany), Titular Bishop of Lycopolis (1938.10.15 – 1947.12.09); next Titular Bishop of Meloë in Isauria (1947.12.09 – 1964.09.26)
 Auxiliary Bishop: Bruno Wechner (1954.12.31 – 1968.12.09), Titular Bishop of Cartennæ (1954.12.31 – 1968.12.09); later first Bishop of daughter see Feldkirch (Austria) (1968.12.09 – retired 1989.01.21), died 1999Suffragan Bishops of Innsbruck 
 Paulus Rusch (see above'' 1964.08.06 – death  1980.08.13)
 Reinhold Stecher (1980.12.15 – retired 1997.10.10), died 2013
 Alois Kothgasser, Salesians (S.D.B.) (1997.10.10 – 2002.11.27), next Metropolitan Archbishop of Salzburg (Austria) (2002.11.27 – retired 2013.11.04)
 Manfred Scheuer (2003.10.21 – 2015.11.18), next Bishop of Linz (Austria) (2015.11.18 – ...)
 Hermann Glettler (appointed  2017.09.27)

See also 
 List of Catholic dioceses in Austria
 Roman Catholicism in Austria

Sources and external links 
 GCatholic.org - data for all sections
 Diocese website
 Catholic Hierarchy

References

Roman Catholic dioceses in Austria
Roman Catholic Ecclesiastical Province of Salzburg
Organisations based in Innsbruck
Religious organizations established in 1925
Roman Catholic dioceses and prelatures established in the 20th century